Daughters of Eve may refer to:

 Daughters of Eve, a UK-based non profit organisation that works to protect girls and young women who are at risk from female genital mutilation
 Daughters of Eve (band), an American all-female garage rock band 
 Daughters of Eve (novel), a 1979 novel by Lois Duncan

See also
 Daughter of Eve, an album from Swedish pop and country singer Jill Johnson